Voce is a defunct mobile phone company.

Voce may also refer to:

Voce (surname)
Voce (choir), a chamber choir based in Hartford, Connecticut
Voce (song), a 2021 song by Madame
Voce Chamber Choir, a London-based chamber choir
Una Voce, a federation of Catholic lay organisations attached to the Tridentine Mass
VoCE, a Japanese beauty magazine

See also 
Yanni Voces, a 2008 Spanish-language album by Yanni
 La Voce (disambiguation)